Rano Kau is a  tall dormant volcano that forms the southwestern headland of Easter Island, a Chilean island in the Pacific Ocean. It was formed of basaltic lava flows in the Pleistocene with its youngest rocks dated at between 150,000 and 210,000 years ago.

The crater 

Rano Kau has a crater lake which is one of the island's only three natural bodies of fresh water. The volcanic cone is largely surrounded by water, and much of it has been eroded back to form high sea cliffs which at one point (te kari kari) have started to bite into the crater wall. The inside walls of the crater are sloped at an angle of between 65° (steepest, near the crest) and 45° (gentlest, at the lake shore). On its northern side, the volcano slopes down to Mataveri International Airport.

Rano Kau is in the World Heritage Site of Rapa Nui National Park and gives its name to one of the seven sections of the park. The principal archaeological site on Rano Kau is the ruined ceremonial village of Orongo which is located at the point where the sea cliff and inner crater wall converge. One ahu with several moai was recorded on the cliffs at Rano Kau in the 1880s, but had fallen to the beach by the time of the Routledge expedition in 1914.

As well as basalt, it contains several other igneous rocks including obsidian (for which it was one of the major sources for the island's stoneworkers) and pumice.

The crater is almost a mile across and has its own micro climate. Sheltered from the winds that wet most of the rest of the island, figs and vines flourish at Rano Kau. The inner slope was the site of the last toromiro tree in the wild until the specimen was chopped down for firewood in 1960.

Geothermal activity 
At some point in the early twentieth century, the island's manager took a photograph of steam coming out of the crater wall.

See also 

 List of volcanoes in Chile
 Sirolimus

References

 
 Katherine Routledge, 1919. The Mystery of Easter Island. 
 Van Tilburg, Jo Anne. 1994. Easter Island: Archaeology, Ecology and Culture. Washington D.C.: Smithsonian Institution Press.

External links

  Rapa Nui National Park
 Rapa Nui National Park – UNESCO World Heritage Centre

Easter Island
Extinct volcanoes
Pleistocene volcanoes
Volcanoes of Easter Island
Calderas of Chile
Volcanic crater lakes